Soldier Creek may refer to:

 Soldier Creek (Kansas River), a river in Kansas
 Soldier Creek (Niobrara River tributary), a stream in Knox County, Nebraska
 Soldier Creek, a stream in Carbon County, Utah that flows into the Price River
 Soldier Creek, a stream in Tooele County, Utah that flows into Rush Lake
 Soldier Creek (Utah County, Utah), a stream that flows into the Spanish Fork (river)
 Soldier Creek Dam, a dam on the Strawberry River in Wasatch County, Utah
 Soldier Creek Wilderness, a wilderness area in Nebraska